Varudu is a 2010 Indian Telugu-language romantic action film directed by Gunasekhar in his tenth directorial film. This film stars Allu Arjun, Arya, and Bhanu Sri Mehra, while Suhasini Mani Ratnam, Ashish Vidyarthi, and Brahmanandam, among others, play supporting roles. D.V.V. Danayya is the producer of the film. The music was composed by Mani Sharma, and the film released on 31 March 2010. The movie opened up to negative reviews and was a disaster at the box-office.

Plot
Sandeep 'Sandy' (Allu Arjun) is a next-gen youngster who parties hard and has a modern outlook, but his ideas towards marriage are traditional. As he gets a job in the US, his parents Vasundhara (Suhasini) and Raj Gopal (Ashish Vidyarthi), who got married against their respective parents' wishes, ask him to get married. He accepts and tells them that he will marry a girl of their choice in a ceremony that lasts five days. He also refuses to see his bride until the marriage. Everything is arranged according to his wishes, and his marriage is fixed with Deepthi (Bhanu Sri Mehra). At the ceremony, when Sandy and Deepthi see each other, they fall in love at first sight. But during the ceremony, Deepthi gets kidnapped by a local goon named Diwakar (Arya). Sandy's family tries to convince him for another marriage, but he refuses and tries finding Deepthi. He gets to know Deepthi's whereabouts. Diwakar kidnapped Deepthi to take revenge from her as she slapped him for misbehaving with her in public. The police gets killed by Diwakar and his men. Sandy takes the law into his hands and kidnaps Diwakar's brother Prabhakar. He threatens to kill Prabhakar if he doesn't release Deepthi. Diwakar releases Deepthi and he kills Prabhakar infront of them because Prabhakar wanted Deepthi. In the scuffle, Sandeep challenges Diwakar to come to their marriage and try to kidnap Deepthi infront of his eyes, to which he agrees. Sandy and Deepthi get married successfully, this time with all the rituals. When they step out of the mandap, Diwakar attacks Sandy. A fight happens in which Sandy confronts  Diwakar and kills him. Sandy and Deepthi then live happily ever after.

Cast 

 Allu Arjun as Sandeep (Sandy), protagonist 
 Arya as Diwakar, antagonist
 Bhanu Sri Mehra as Deepthi,  Sandeep's bride and love interest 
 Suhasini Mani Ratnam as Vasundhara, Sandeep's mother 
 Ashish Vidyarthi as Raj Gopal, Sandeep's father 
 Naresh as Deepthi's father
 Vinaya Prasad as Deepthi's mother
 Kishori Ballal as Sandeep's grandmother
 Nassar as Commissioner Ahmed Khan
 Brahmanandam as Dilip Raja
 Sayaji Shinde as Home Minister
 Rao Ramesh as ACP Umesh Gupta
 Ahuti Prasad as Prabhakar, Diwakar's brother
 Diksha Panth as Sandy's friend
 Kondavalasa Lakshmana Rao as Diwakar's assistant
 Fish Venkat as Diwakar's assistant
 Harsha Vardhan as Babji
 Pradeep Machiraju as Abhiram
 Singeetam Srinivasa Rao
 Anita Chowdary as Sindhu
 Sameer as Sindhu's husband
 Karuna as Deepti's friend
 Raghava as Dilip Raja's assistant
 Mahen
 Balaraju
 Kuldip Patel
 Neha Patel
 Sneha Ullal (Cameo appearance)
 Ali (Cameo appearance)
 Sunil (Cameo appearance)
 Sony John (Cameo appearance)

Soundtrack

Though Singer Malavika sang the song Relare Relare, Geetha Madhuri who lent vocals for only very few lines, was credited as the singer. The audio rendered by Mani Sharma was launched on 7 March 2010 at Ramanaidu Studios in Hyderabad. The audio was released in the market by Aditya Music. The event was held in a wedding atmosphere with the cast and crew dressed in traditional attire. Film personalities like Allu Arjun, Allu Aravind, Gunasekhar, Veturi, Mani Sharma, Sirish, D. V. V. Danayya, Dil Raju, Thota Prasad, S. S. Rajamouli, Daggubati Suresh Babu, Shyam Prasad Reddy, Kondavalasa Lakshmana Rao, K. S. Rama Rao, B. Gopal, M. L. Kumar Chowdary, B. V. S. N. Prasad, K. L. Narayana, etc., were present. The audio CDs were released by S. S. Rajamouli, and the first copy was received by Allu Aravind. The audio cassettes were released by Shyam Prasad Reddy, and he presented the first copy to Daggubati Suresh Babu. The function began with the dance performances for Allu Arjun's earlier film songs. Veturi was felicitated at the Audio Release function, and it turned out to be his penultimate movie  before his Death on 22 May 2010.

Awards
 2010 – Nandi Award for Best Special Effects – Sri Alagar Swamy.

Reception
Varudu had poor reviews

References

External links

2010 films
2010s Telugu-language films
Films scored by Mani Sharma
Indian romantic action films
Films directed by Gunasekhar
Films about Indian weddings